Ahn Changho, sometimes An Chang-ho (November 9, 1878 – March 10, 1938) was a Korean independence activist and one of the early leaders of the Korean-American immigrant community in the United States. He is also referred to by his pen name Dosan (도산; 島山 ). A Protestant social activist, he established the Shinminhoe (New Korea Society) when he returned to Korea from the US in 1907. It was the most important organization to fight the Japanese occupation of Korea. He established the Young Korean Academy (흥사단; 興士團) in San Francisco in 1913 and was a key member in the founding of the Provisional Government of the Republic of Korea in Shanghai in 1919.  Ahn is one of two men believed to have written the lyrics of "Aegukga", the South Korean national anthem. Besides his work for the Independence Movement, Dosan wanted to reform the Korean people's character and the entire social system of Korea. Dosan's key efforts were in educational reforms and modernizing. He was the father of actors Ralph, Philip Ahn, and US Navy Lieutenant Susan Ahn Cuddy, who also later worked for the Office of Naval Intelligence, the National Security Agency, the Library of Congress, and the US Department of Defense.

Life

Background and education

Ahn was born Ahn Chi-sam, on the 6th day of the 10th lunar month 1878 in Kangso County, Pyeongan province, in present-day South Pyongan, North Korea. His birth date is equivalent to 10 November 1878 on the Gregorian calendar but he chose to use the date 9 November 1878 on his vita. Ahn is the family name, chi is the generation marker, and sam refers to the fact that he was the third son of Ahn Kyon-jin (father) and Lady Hwang (Mother). Dosan came from the Sunheung Ahn clan (순흥안씨; 順興安氏), where his ancestry can be traced back to prominent Goryeo scholar, Ahn Hyang.

It is believed that he changed his name to Chang-ho when he began public speaking as a teenager. His father also changed his name from Ahn Kyo-jin to Ahn Heung-guk.

In 1894, Ahn moved to Seoul and in 1895, he attended Save the World School (Gusae Hakdang), a Presbyterian missionary-sponsored school in Seoul run by Horace G. Underwood and Rev. F.S. Miller. Dosan eventually converted to Christianity. While he was a student at Gusae he worked for Dr. Oliver R. Avison at Jejungwon, the first medical institution in Korea which became Severance Hospital and is now part of Yonsei University Medical Center.

On November 8, 2013, Dosan was posthumously given an Honorary Diploma by Yonsei University in recognition of his attendance at Gusae Hakdang and for his work there as a teaching assistant; and, for his work at Jejungwon while at Gusae and at Severance Hospital in the early 1900s.

Immigration to America 

In October 1902, Ahn came to San Francisco with his wife Helen (Hye Ryeon Lee/이혜련) to pursue a better education. They were the first married couple to come from Korea to the United States of America. Their passports from Emperor Gojong were numbers 51 and 52.  While living in San Francisco, California, he witnessed two Korean Ginseng merchants fighting in the streets over sales turf.  Ahn was apparently upset by this display of incivility among his countrymen overseas, so he began to invest time into reforming the earliest local Korean community members, rising to become one of the first leaders of the Korean-American community.

He founded the Friendship Society (Chinmoke Hoe/친목회) in 1903, the first group that was organized exclusively for Koreans in the United States. April 5, 1905, he changed the Chinmokehoe name to the Mutual Assistance Society (MAS)(Kongrip Hyophoe/공립협회) with its headquarters at 938 Pacific St. in San Francisco. This was the first Korean political organization in the United States. The first Korean newspaper Kongnip Sinbo started on November 20, 1905, there. In reaction to the Durham White Stevens assassination on March 23, 1908, the MAS would eventually merge with the United Korean Society (Hapsong Hyophoe/합성협회) in Hawaii to become the Korean National Association (Daehan Inguk Hoe) (대한인국민회; 大韓人國民會) in 1909, the official agent of Koreans in the United States until the end of World War II.

Return to Korea

In 1926 departing from San Pedro, California, by ship, Dosan traveled back to China, never returning to the United States to live for long.  (He was resident with his family at 106 North Figueroa St, Los Angeles, on April 24, 1930.) During Dosan's anti-Japanese activism in Korea, he was arrested and imprisoned by the Japanese Imperialist government at least five times. He was first arrested in 1909 in connection with Ahn Jung-geun's assassination of Itō Hirobumi, the Japanese Resident General of Korea. Dosan was tortured and punished many times during the years of his activism. In 1932 he was arrested in Shanghai, China in connection with Yun Bong-gil's bombing at Hongkew Park (April 29, 1932). He was a naturalized Chinese citizen at this time and illegally extradited back to Korea, where he was convicted of violating Japan's "Preservation of Peace Laws" and sentenced to five years in Taejon prison.

Death
In 1937, Japanese authorities arrested Ahn, but due to complications from severe internal illness, he was released on bail and transferred to the Keijō Imperial University Hospital where he died on March 10, 1938. Judging that Ahn Changho's death might lead to a popular demonstration, the Japanese military limited the number of people attending the funeral, allowing only a small number of relatives to attend.

Legacy and memorials

Many consider Ahn Chang-ho to be one of the key moral and philosophical leaders of Korea during the 20th century.  In the turmoil immediately before and during the Japanese occupation of Korea, he called for the moral and spiritual renewal of the Korean people through education as one of the important components in their struggle for independence and building a democratic society. Dosan also included economic and military components in his independence movement strategies.

The Dosan Park and Memorial Hall were built to honor Ahn's memory in Gangnam-gu, Seoul. Another memorial was built in downtown Riverside, California, to honor him. Ahn's family home on 36th Place in Los Angeles has been restored by the University of Southern California, on whose campus it sits (albeit in a different location). Dosan never lived in the house on the USC campus since the Ahn family moved there in 1935 many years after Dosan had gone back to Shanghai.

At the request of Congresswoman Diane Watson, the USPS Post Office in Koreatown at Harvard and 6th Street was named Dosan Ahn Chang Ho Station. This was the first USPS naming honoring an Asian.

In 2011, the Ellis Island Foundation installed a plaque honoring Dosan  to commemorate the 100th anniversary of his entrance to the United States through Ellis Island from London on September 3, 1911. He sailed from Glasgow aboard the SS Caledonia.

The City of Los Angeles, in the early 1990s, declared the nearby intersection of Jefferson Boulevard and Van Buren Place - across from the Korean National Association and Korean Presbyterian church - to be named "Dosan Ahn Chang Ho Square" in his honor. In 2002, the main freeway interchange in downtown Los Angeles where the 10 Freeway and 110 Freeway meet was also renamed the Dosan Ahn Chang Ho Memorial Interchange.

The third pattern of ITF-style Taekwondo, which is made up of 24 movements, is called Do-San or Dosan in his honor. This is the pattern that is required to advance from 7th Kup Yellow Belt with Green Tag to 6th Kup Green Belt.

In 2012, Ahn was posthumously inducted into the International Civil Rights Walk of Fame at the Martin Luther King Jr. National Historic Site in Atlanta, Georgia. His grandson Philip Cuddy accepted the honor at the ceremony in Atlanta on behalf of Dosan.

On November 8, 2013, Dosan was given an Honorary Diploma by his alma mater, Yonsei University, in recognition of his service as teaching assistant at Gusae Hakdang and for his work at Jejungwon and Severance Hospital. Dosan was also a good influence on many Yonsei and Severance Medical School alumni. Susan Cuddy's son, Philip Cuddy, initiated the awarding of the honorary diploma and provide the historical records. Yonsei President accepted the diploma in a ceremony in Seoul on behalf of Dosan.

The Republic of Korea Navy Dosan Ahn Changho-class submarine was named in his honor and the lead ship entered service on 13 August 2021.

Family
 Helen Lee (Yi Hye-ryon), 1884–1969
 Philip Ahn, 1905–1978
 Philson Ahn, 1912–2001
 Susan Ahn Cuddy, 1915–2015
 Soorah Ahn Buffum, 1917–2016
 Ralph Ahn, 1926–2022

See also
Korea under Japanese rule
Korean independence movements
List of Koreans

References

External links
 The Ahn Chang Ho Website
 Patriot Dosan Ahn Chang-ho Memorial , International Relations Council of Riverside, CA.
 Photos of Riverside Memorial

1878 births
1938 deaths
People from Nampo
People from South Pyongan
Korean writers
Korean Christians
Korean independence activists
Culture of Riverside, California
Korean emigrants to the United States
National anthem writers